Dicobalt edetate is the coordination compound with the approximate formula Co2(EDTA)(H2O)6. It is a derivative of the (non-natural) amino acid ethylenediaminetetraacetate.

Solutions of this solid have been used in Europe as an antidote to cyanide poisoning, with the trade name Kelocyanor. However, dicobalt edetate is itself toxic, particularly if there is not enough cyanide in the blood to react with it, so it is only suitable for serious cases of poisoning. In the past, workplaces in the UK that handle cyanide were recommended to keep a 'Kelocyanor kit', to be taken to the hospital along with the patient, but this practice has been discontinued since it may mislead doctors into using the antidote unnecessarily.

Structure
The compound is polymeric in the crystalline form.  Half of the Co2+ ions are bound to the EDTA2− and the other Co2+ ions are bound to four water ligands as well as carboxylate ligands on the [Co(EDTA)]2− entity. In aqueous solution, depolymerization occurs to give [Co(EDTA)]2− and [Co(H2O)6]2+ ions, each of which is kinetically labile and has a high affinity for cyanide.

Related compounds
Oxidation of  [Co(II)(EDTA)]2− gives [Co(III)(EDTA)]−, which is so kinetically inert that it can be resolved optically.

References

Cobalt compounds